

List of countries

Central America
Political parties